The UEFA Women's Euro 2017 qualifying competition was a women's football competition that determined the 15 teams joining the automatically qualified hosts Netherlands in the UEFA Women's Euro 2017 final tournament.

A total of 46 UEFA member national teams, with Andorra entering for the first time at senior women's level, entered the qualifying competition.

Format
The qualifying competition consisted of three rounds:
Preliminary round: The eight lowest-ranked teams were drawn into two groups of four teams. Each group was played in single round-robin format at one of the teams which were pre-selected as hosts. The two group winners advanced to the qualifying group stage.
Qualifying group stage: The 40 teams (38 highest-ranked teams and two preliminary round qualifiers) are drawn into eight groups of five teams. Each group was played in home-and-away round-robin format. The eight group winners and the six best runners-up (not counting results against the fifth-placed team) qualified directly for the final tournament, while the two remaining runners-up advance to the play-offs.
Play-offs: The two teams played home-and-away two-legged matches to determine the last qualified team.

Tiebreakers
In the preliminary round and qualifying group stage, the teams are ranked according to points (3 points for a win, 1 point for a draw, 0 points for a loss). If two or more teams are equal on points on completion of a group, the following tie-breaking criteria are applied, in the order given, to determine the rankings (Regulations Articles 13.01, 13.02 and 15.01):
Higher number of points obtained in the mini-tournament or group matches played among the teams in question;
Superior goal difference resulting from the mini-tournament or group matches played among the teams in question;
Higher number of goals scored in the mini-tournament or group matches played among the teams in question;
(Qualifying group stage only) Higher number of goals scored away from home in the group matches played among the teams in question;
If, after having applied criteria 1 to 4, teams still have an equal ranking, criteria 1 to 4 are reapplied exclusively to the mini-tournament or group matches between the teams in question to determine their final rankings. If this procedure does not lead to a decision, criteria 6 to 11 apply;
Superior goal difference in all mini-tournament or group matches;
Higher number of goals scored in all mini-tournament or group matches;
(Qualifying group stage only) Higher number of away goals scored in all group matches;
(Preliminary round only) If only two teams have the same number of points, and they are tied according to criteria 1 to 7 after having met in the last round of the mini-tournament, their rankings are determined by a penalty shoot-out (not used if more than two teams have the same number of points, or if their rankings are not relevant for qualification for the next stage).
Lower disciplinary points total based only on yellow and red cards received in the mini-tournament or group matches (red card = 3 points, yellow card = 1 point, expulsion for two yellow cards in one match = 3 points);
Position in the UEFA women's national team coefficient ranking for the preliminary round or qualifying group stage draw.

To determine the six best runners-up from the qualifying group stage, the results against the teams in fifth place are discarded. The following criteria are applied (Regulations Article 15.02):
Higher number of points;
Superior goal difference;
Higher number of goals scored;
Higher number of away goals scored;
Lower disciplinary points total based only on yellow and red cards received (red card = 3 points, yellow card = 1 point, expulsion for two yellow cards in one match = 3 points);
Position in the UEFA women's national team coefficient ranking for the qualifying group stage draw.

In the play-offs, the team that scores more goals on aggregate over the two legs qualifies for the final tournament. If the aggregate score is level, the away goals rule is applied, i.e., the team that scores more goals away from home over the two legs advances. If away goals are also equal, extra time is played. The away goals rule is again applied after extra time, i.e., if there are goals scored during extra time and the aggregate score is still level, the visiting team advances by virtue of more away goals scored. If no goals are scored during extra time, the tie is decided by penalty shoot-out (Regulations Articles 16.01 and 16.02).

Schedule
The qualifying matches are played on dates that fall within the FIFA Women's International Match Calendar.

Entrants
The teams were ranked according to their coefficient ranking, calculated based on the following:
2011 FIFA Women's World Cup final tournament and qualifying competition (20%)
UEFA Women's Euro 2013 final tournament and qualifying competition (40%)
2015 FIFA Women's World Cup qualifying competition (40%)

The 38 highest-ranked teams entered the qualifying group stage, while the eight lowest-ranked teams entered the preliminary round. The coefficient ranking was also used for seeding in the qualifying group stage draw.

{|
|-
|+Teams entering preliminary round
|- valign=top
|

|}

Notes
Teams which were pre-selected as preliminary round hosts were denoted by (H).
Teams marked in bold' have qualified for the final tournament.

Preliminary round

Draw
The draw for the preliminary round was held on 19 January 2015, 13:45 CET (UTC+1), at the UEFA headquarters in Nyon, Switzerland.

The teams were divided into two pots: Pot 1 contained the two teams which were pre-selected as hosts (Malta and Moldova), while Pot 2 contained the six remaining teams (Andorra, Faroe Islands, Georgia, Latvia, Lithuania, and Luxembourg). Each group contained one team from Pot 1 and three teams from Pot 2.

Groups

Group 1

Group 2

Qualifying group stage
Draw
The draw for the qualifying group stage was held on 20 April 2015, 14:00 CEST (UTC+2), at the UEFA headquarters in Nyon, Switzerland.

The teams were seeded according to their coefficient ranking (see section Entrants)''. Each group contained one team from each of the five seeding pots. The two teams which qualified from the preliminary round, Moldova and Georgia, were placed in Pot E for the group stage draw.

Groups

Group 1

Group 2

Group 3

Group 4

Group 5

Group 6

Group 7

Group 8

Ranking of second-placed teams

Play-offs

Draw
The draw for the play-offs (to decide the order of legs) was held on 23 September 2016, 14:00 CEST (UTC+2), at the UEFA headquarters in Nyon, Switzerland.

Matches
The play-off winner qualifies for the final tournament.

Qualified teams
The following 16 teams qualify for the final tournament.

1 Bold indicates champion for that year. Italic indicates host for that year.
2 As West Germany

Top goalscorers
Players with six goals or more.

10 goals

 Harpa Þorsteinsdóttir
 Ada Hegerberg
 Jane Ross

8 goals

 Eugénie Le Sommer
 Verónica Boquete

7 goals

 Pernille Harder
 Nadia Nadim
 Dagný Brynjarsdóttir
 Isabell Herlovsen
 Ana-Maria Crnogorčević
 Helen Ward

6 goals

 Milena Nikolić
 Sanne Troelsgaard Nielsen
 Karen Carney
 Danielle Carter
 Cristiana Girelli
 Cláudia Neto
 Joanne Love
 Sonia Bermúdez
 Fabienne Humm

References

External links

 
Qualifying
2017
2015 in women's association football
2016 in women's association football
Women's Euro Qualifying
Women's Euro 2017 Qualifying